Jonas Heymans (born 6 February 1993) is a Belgian footballer who last played as a left-back for RFC Wetteren.

Honours

Club
Willem II
Eerste Divisie (1): 2013–14

External links
 Voetbal International profile 
 
 
 

1993 births
Living people
Belgian footballers
Belgium under-21 international footballers
Belgium youth international footballers
Lierse S.K. players
AZ Alkmaar players
Willem II (football club) players
Royal Antwerp F.C. players
FC Den Bosch players
S.C. Eendracht Aalst players
Belgian Pro League players
Challenger Pro League players
Eredivisie players
Eerste Divisie players
Belgian expatriate footballers
Expatriate footballers in the Netherlands
Belgian expatriate sportspeople in the Netherlands
Association football defenders